Bradley Creek is a river in San Mateo County, California, and is a tributary of the Pescadero Creek.

Tributaries
Chandler Gulch
Shaw Gulch

References

See also
List of watercourses in the San Francisco Bay Area

Rivers of San Mateo County, California
Rivers of Northern California
Tributaries of Pescadero Creek